Seiji Inagaki (born 28 April 1973) is a retired Japanese athlete who specialized in the 400 metres hurdles.

He won bronze medals in 4 × 400 metres relay in two editions of the World Indoor Championships; in 1993 with teammates Masayoshi Kan, Yoshihiko Saito and Hiroyuki Hayashi and in 1995 with Kan, Hayashi and Tomonari Ono. He also competed in the same event at the 1997 World Championships without reaching the final.

References

1973 births
Living people
Japanese male hurdlers
Japanese male sprinters
Universiade medalists in athletics (track and field)
Athletes (track and field) at the 1994 Asian Games
Universiade silver medalists for Japan
Asian Games competitors for Japan
World Athletics Indoor Championships medalists
Medalists at the 1993 Summer Universiade
20th-century Japanese people